The Mariinsky Ballet is the resident classical ballet company of the Mariinsky Theatre in Saint Petersburg, Russia. 

Founded in the 18th century and originally known as the Imperial Russian Ballet, the Mariinsky Ballet is one of the world's leading ballet companies.  Internationally in some quarters, the Mariinsky Ballet continues to be known by its former Soviet name the Kirov Ballet.  The Mariinsky Ballet is the parent company of the Vaganova Ballet Academy, a leading international ballet school.

History

The Mariinsky Ballet was founded in the 1740s, following the formation of the first Russian dance school in 1738.

The Imperial Theatre School, as it was originally known, was established on 4 May 1738, at the Winter Palace in Saint Petersburg. It would become the predecessor of today's Vaganova Academy of Russian Ballet.  The school's founder director was the French ballet master and teacher Jean-Baptiste Landé and the purpose of creating the school was to train young dancers to form the first Russian ballet company.

As the Imperial Russian Ballet, the company premiered numerous ballets by choreographer Marius Petipa. A number of his ballets now form the basis of the traditional classical ballet repertoire, performed by ballet companies around the world, and often retaining much of Petipa's choreography. These ballets include the original productions of The Nutcracker, The Sleeping Beauty, Don Quixote, La Bayadère, and Raymonda; and popular revivals of older ballets, including Coppélia, Giselle, and Le Corsaire. Petipa's revival of the ballet Swan Lake is perhaps his most famous work for the company. Originally choreographed by Julius Reisinger for the Bolshoi Theatre in 1877, Swan Lake was initially a critical and commercial failure. Petipa sought to revive the ballet with the blessing of Pyotr Ilyich Tchaikovsky, but the composer died before the new ballet was created. Petipa consequently worked with his brother Modest Tchaikovsky, who significantly revised the story and rewrote the libretto to the version now commonly performed. The production was choreographed by Petipa and his collaborator Lev Ivanov. Premiering at the Mariinsky Theatre in 1895, the Petipa/Ivanov/Tchaikovsky production of Swan Lake was a success.

Following the Russian Revolution, the Soviet government decided that the ballet school and company were unwanted symbols of the tsarist regime and closed them both. The ballet company was the first to be re-established, becoming in 1920 known as the State Academic Theatre of Opera and Ballet, with the school re-opening later in 1924 as the Leningrad State Choreographic School, both in their previous locations.

After the assassination of prominent Soviet figure Sergey Kirov in 1934, the Soviet Ballet was renamed the Kirov Ballet in 1935, a name which is still sometimes incorrectly used. After the end of Communist rule, the ballet company and opera company were renamed for the theatre, becoming in 1992 the Mariinsky Ballet and Mariinsky Opera. Both companies are now run by the theatre itself.

Today

The Director of the Mariinsky Ballet is Yuri Fateyev.

Repertoire

Adagio Hammerklavier 
Anna Karenina-Alexei Ratmansky version
Apollo
Ballet Imperial (Ballet No 2)
Bambi
La Bayadère
Bolero Factory
The Bronze Horseman
Camera obscura
Carmen Suite
Carnaval
The Cat on the Tree
Chopiniana
Choreographic Game 3x3
Cinderella-Alexei Ratmansky version
Concerto DSCH
Le Corsaire
Le Divertissement du roi
Don Quixote
Elegy. Ophelia
The Firebird
Fountain of Bakhchisarai
The Four Seasons
Giselle
Infra
In the Middle, Somewhat Elevated'
In the NightIn the JungleInside the Lines;;JewelsThe Legend of Love-choreography Yury GrigorovichLeningrad SymphonyThe Little Humpbacked Horse-Alexei Ratmansky versionMarguerite and ArmandA Midsummer Night's DreamLes nocesThe Nutcracker-Marius Petipa versionThe Nutcracker-Mihail Chemiakin versionPaquita-Yuri Smekalov version
Paquita Grand PasPavlovskLe ParcPetrouchkaPetrouchka-Vladimir Varnava and Konstantin Fyodorov versionPolovtsian Dances (ballet)
The Prodigal Son
Raymonda
Le Réveil de Flore
Romeo and Juliet-Leonid Lavrovsky version
Russian Overture
Le Sacre Du Primtemps
Sacre
Scheherazade
Scotch Symphony
Second I
Serenade
Shurale
Solo
Sleeping Beauty-Konstantin Sergeev versionSleeping Beauty-Sergei Vikharev version
Spartacus-Leonid Yakobson versionLe Spectre de la roseThe Stone Flower
The SwanSwan LakeLa SylphideSylvia
Symphony in CSymphony in Three MovementsTarantellaTchaikovsky Pas de deuxThe Vertiginous Thrill of ExactitudeVariations for two couplesViolin Concerto No. 2WithoutYaroslavna. The EclipseThe Young Lady and the Hooligan5 Tangos''

Dancers 
The basis of the Mariinsky Ballet consists of the following artists:

Principals

 Nadezhda Batoeva
 Ekaterina Kondaurova
 Olesya Novikova
 Oksana Skorik
 Alina Somova
 Viktoria Tereshkina
 Diana Vishneva
 Timur Askerov
 Yevgeny Ivanchenko
 Kimin Kim
 Vladimir Shklyarov
 Andrey Ermakov

First Soloists

 Maria Ilyushkina
 Maria Khoreva
 Anastasia Kolegova
 May Nagahisa
 Yekaterina Osmolkina
 Renata Shakirova
 Kristina Shapran
 Maria Shirinkina
 Elena Evseeva
 Alexander Sergeev
 Philipp Stepin
 Konstantin Zverev

Second Soloists

 Vlada Borodulina
 Maria Bulanova
 Alexandra Iosifidi
 Alexandra Khiteyeva
 Anastasia Lukina
 Valeria Martynyuk
 Camilla Mazzi
 Anastasia Nuikina
 Yana Selina
 Tatiana Tkachenko
 Roman Belyakov
 Evgeni Konovalov
 Nikita Korneyev
 Ivan Oskorbin
 Yuri Smekalov
 Alexei Timofeyev
 David Zaleyev
 Maxim Zyuzin

Character Soloists

 Elena Bazhenova
 Olga Belik
 Alisa Rusina
 Islom Baimuradov
 Soslan Kulaev
 Dmitry Pykhachov
 Vasily Shcherbakov
 Andrei Yakovlev

Coryphees

 Yuliana Chereshkevich
 Shamala Guseinova
 Daria Ionova
 Viktoria Krasnokutskaya
 Anastasia Nikitina
 Zlata Yalinich
 Yaroslav Baibordin
 Ramanbek Beishenaliev
 Roman Malyshev
 Alexei Nedviga
 Grigory Popov
 Yaroslav Pushkov
 Andrei Solovyov

Notable dancers

Altynai Asylmuratova
Mikhail Baryshnikov
Vakhtang Chabukiani
Petra Conti
Natalia Dudinskaya
Pavel Gerdt
Tamara Karsavina
Maria Khoreva
Irina Kolpakova
Theodore Kosloff
Mathilde Kschessinska
Ninel Kurgapkina
Pierina Legnani
Larissa Lezhnina
Ulyana Lopatkina
Askold Makarov
Natalia Makarova
Varvara P. Mey
Galina Mezentseva
Vaslav Nijinsky
Rudolf Nureyev
Alla Osipenko
Anna Pavlova
Olga Preobrajenska
Farukh Ruzimatov
Leonid Sarafanov
Marina Semyonova
Konstantin Sergeyev
Alla Sizova
Yuri Soloviev
Olga Spessivtzeva
Galina Ulanova
Diana Vishneva
Svetlana Zakharova
Igor Zelensky

See also
List of productions of Swan Lake derived from its 1895 revival

References

External links
  
  
 Mariinsky Ballet International Tour Schedule
 Additional Information/Pictures about the Mariinsky-Kirov Ballet
 More information and interviews from the Kirov Ballet
 
 NY Times article by Lawrence van Gelder, March 25, 2008
 Kennedy Center: Information about Mariinsky Ballet accessed 4 October 2008

 
1740 establishments in the Russian Empire
History of ballet
National Dance Award winners